Bistolida stolida, common name the stolid cowrie, is a species of sea snail, a cowry, a marine gastropod mollusc in the family Cypraeidae, the cowries.

Subspecies
The following subspecies are recognized :
 Bistolida stolida brianoi Lorenz, 2002
 Bistolida stolida clavicola Lorenz, 1998
 Bistolida stolida crossei  (Marie, E., 1869) (synonyms : Bistolida nandronga Steadman, W.R. & B.C. Cotton, 1943; Bistolida stolida crossei thakau (f) Steadman, W.R. & B.C. Cotton, 1943)
 Bistolida stolida kwajaleinensis  (Martin, P. & J. Senders, 1983)
 Bistolida stolida rubiginosa (Gmelin, J.F., 1791)
 forma : Bistolida stolida rubiginosa rufodentata (f) Biraghi, G., 1976
 Bistolida stolida salaryensis Bozzetti, 2008
 forma : Bistolida stolida salaryensis fulva (f)  Bozzetti, L., 2009
 Bistolida stolida stolida (Linnaeus, 1758) (synonyms : Cypraea draco Röding, P.F., 1798; Cypraea gelasima Melvill, J.C., 1888; Cypraea irvinae Cox, J.C., 1889)
 forma : Bistolida stolida stolida vietnamensis (f)
 Bistolida stolida uvongoensis Massier, 2004

Description
The dorsum surface is very smooth and shiny, the basic color is blue-gray, white or light tan, with large irregular dark brown dorsal blotches. The margins are decorated with two  orange - brown spots. The base may be white or pink, with a long and narrow aperture and long white or brown fine teeth. Both the extremities are more or less rostrated, with an orange brown blotch. In the living cowry the mantle is transparent with white long tree-shaped sensorial papillae and can be completely retracted into the shell.

Distribution
This species and its subspecies can be found in the seas along Aldabra, Chagos, the Comores, Kenya, Madagascar, the Mascarene Basin, Mauritius, Mozambique, Réunion, the Seychelles, South Africa, Tanzania, in the Indian Ocean and in the Western and Central Pacific Ocean in the Kwajalein Atoll, New Caledonia, Guam, Samoa Islands and the Marshall Islands, Melanesia and along Vietnam, Taiwan, Australia, Sulu Sea,  Samar Island and Philippines.

Habitat
During the day they are usually hidden under rocks and in crevices, as only at dusk they start feeding on sponges or algae.

References

 Verdcourt, B. (1954). The cowries of the East African Coast (Kenya, Tanganyika, Zanzibar and Pemba). Journal of the East Africa Natural History Society 22(4) 96: 129-144, 17 pls.
 Burgess, C.M. (1970). The Living Cowries. AS Barnes and Co, Ltd. Cranbury, New Jersey

External links
 Biolib
 Underwater

Cypraeidae
Gastropods described in 1758
Taxa named by Carl Linnaeus